Jeffrey William Toyne (born January 7, 1975) is a Canadian film composer and recipient of Playback Magazine's 2011 Ten to Watch honor.

Early life
Born in Sault Ste. Marie, Ontario, Canada, Toyne earned a bachelor's degree in music composition from the University of Western Ontario. He pursued graduate studies in composition at the University of British Columbia, graduating with a master's degree in 1999.  Immediately thereafter, he was selected to hold one of the coveted composer-participant positions at the Henry Mancini Institute in Los Angeles.  There, while writing and conducting several new works, he had the opportunity to study with such jazz and film artists as Jerry Goldsmith, Jack Smalley, Manny Albam, Michael Abene, Bob Florence, Jim McNeely, John Clayton (bassist), Alf Clausen and Horace Silver.  This experience was pivotal in broadening Toyne's compositional scope to encompass not only a classical twentieth century idiom, but also jazz, blues and popular music.

Toyne then enrolled in the Scoring for Motion Pictures and Television post-graduate program at the University of Southern California in August 2000. Following his graduation from the program in May 2001, he began working alongside respected film composer Edward Shearmur in Los Angeles.

Career
Toyne completed the score to his first feature film, Maxwell’s Demon, in 1998.  The film premiered at the 1998 Atlantic Film Festival, and has subsequently aired on both the SPACE and Bravo!.  The soundtrack, available on the No Records label, was released that same year.  Among his other film credits he counts the feature film Midnight is Coming (2002), and over forty short films in which he has collaborated with some of Los Angeles’ finest young directors, including two student Academy Award nominees: Aina Abiodun on The Beginning of Time (2000) and Heather Lenz on Back to Back (2001).

In 2011, Toyne scored of his first internationally distributed feature film Dirty Girl, directed by Abe Sylvia and distributed by The Weinstein Company.

For television, Toyne has composed music for various programs including the pilot The Daily Blade, which received its premiere at the 1999 Atlantic Film Festival, and aired on CTV in January 2000. Among his many awards and distinctions, Mr. Toyne counts the Godfrey Ridout Award from the SOCAN Young Composer's Competition (1998).  He has also received numerous commissions for new works by several noted organizations including: the Canadian Armed Forces, for which he composed Splendor Sine Occasu, the Official March of the British Columbia Brigade, and the Vancouver Symphony Orchestra, for which he composed "No Fanfare" as part of their celebration of the 2010 Winter Olympics.

In 2013, Toyne was nominated for a Canadian Screen Award for Best Original Music Score for his work on Magic Beyond Words: The JK Rowling Story

Filmography

Films
The Believer (2021)
Abel's Field (2012)Murder on the 13th Floor (2012)Blooded (2011) co-composed with Ilan EshkeriDirty Girl (2010)Ten Years Later (2009)White Light (2008) additional musicBox Elder (2008)Within (2007)The New Twenty (2007)Shadow in the Trees (2007)I.R.A. : King of Nothing (2006) additional musicThe Third Eye (2006)Beyond Honor (2004) additional musicEl Padrino (2004) additional musicMidnight is Coming (2002)Maxwell's Demon (1998)

TelevisionRogue (series) (2013)Twist of Faith (MOW) (2013)The Real St. Nick (MOW) (2012)Holiday Spin (MOW) (2012)The Devil You Know (series) (2010-2012)Magic Beyond Words: The JK Rowling Story (MOW) (2011)Who Is Clark Rockefeller? (MOW) (2010)
Taken in Broad Daylight (MOW) (2009)
Make or Break TV (series) (2008)
The Egg Factory (MOW) (2008) additional music
The Two Coreys (series) (2007)
Parking Lot Guy (pilot) (2007)
Second Sight (MOW) (2007) additional music
The Perfect Suspect (MOW) (2006) additional music
The First Emperor (special) (2006) additional music
Ultimate Fighter (series) additional music
American Casino (series) additional music
The Daily Blade (pilot) (2000) 

TheatreCopenhagen (Vancouver Playhouse 2005)Below the Belt (Gardner Stages 2004)Edge of Allegiance 3'' (MET Theatre 2004)

Discography
Universal Hall Pass - String arrangements (Mercury 2004)

References

External links
Jeff Toyne Website

1975 births
Living people
Canadian male composers
Canadian film score composers
Male film score composers
Musicians from Sault Ste. Marie, Ontario
University of British Columbia alumni
University of Western Ontario alumni